Phillip Henry and Hannah Martin are an English folk music duo. In 2017, they renamed themselves Edgelarks and released an eponymous album.

Career
In 2008, Henry travelled to Calcutta to study under the slide guitarist Pandit Debashish Bhattacharya. When Henry returned, he joined the band The Roots Union, with Martin, which spent three years on the road. The band came to an end in 2010, and Henry and Martin continued working together. They were "discovered" by Show of Hands frontman Steve Knightley who first encountered the duo busking on the seafront during Devon's Sidmouth Folk Week.

The duo won "Best Folk Act" in the 2013 South West Music Awards, Best Duo title in the 2013 Spiral Earth Awards and Best Duo at the 2014 BBC Radio 2 Folk Awards. They have subsequently been nominated a further two times at the BBC Folk Awards, in 2016 and 2018.

Henry and Martin work with Peter Knight's Gigspanner Trio, to form the five piece Gigspanner Big Band. They are also members of the folk disco project, The Band of Love.

Hannah Martin

Martin is a singer-songwriter and multi-instrumentalist from Devon. Writing on fiddle, viola, and banjo, and drawing on UK traditions, she has been commended by Mike Harding. 2012 saw Martin selected to be part of the National Theatre's War Horse School, working with John Tams, Nancy Kerr, John Kirkpatrick and Chris Parkinson. She was also involved in The Nursery Rhyme Project for the Bristol Old Vic, co-writing and performing in a show exploring one of our oldest oral traditions. She worked with Greg Russell, Nancy Kerr, Tim Yates, and Findlay Napier on the protest song project Shake The Chains.

Philip Henry

Henry is a slide guitarist and harmonica player from Lancashire. He has studied the music of the Deep South of America, of the British Isles, and India. Specializing in lap slides while his harmonica style combines country blues and folk styles with beat-boxing.

Selected discography
Singing The Bones (2011)
Mynd (2013)
 Live In Calstock (2014)
 Watershed (2015)
 Edgelarks (2017)
 Folk Fever (2018) as The Band of Love
 Feather (2019) 
 Henry Martin (2020)

Awards
 Best Duo 2013 Spiral Earth awards
 Best Folk Act 2013 South West Music Awards
 BBC Radio 2 Folk Awards (2014)

References

External links
 

English musical duos
Folk music duos
Musical groups established in 2010
English folk musical groups
2010 establishments in England